Barazarlu (also Romanized as Barāzārlū; also known Barāzānlū) is a village in Tabar Rural District, Jolgeh Shoqan District, Jajrom County, North Khorasan Province, Iran. At the 2006 census, its population was 316, in 82 families.

References 

Populated places in Jajrom County